George Harry Heilmeier (May 22, 1936 – April 21, 2014) was an American engineer, manager, and a pioneering contributor to liquid crystal displays (LCDs), for which he was inducted into the National Inventors Hall of Fame. Heilmeier's work is an IEEE Milestone.

Biography
Heilmeier was born in Philadelphia, Pennsylvania, graduated from Abraham Lincoln High School there, received his BS in Electrical Engineering from the University of Pennsylvania in Philadelphia, and his M.S.E., M.A., and Ph.D. degrees in solid state materials and electronics from Princeton University.

In 1958 Heilmeier joined RCA Laboratories in Princeton, New Jersey, where he worked on parametric amplification, tunnel diode down-converters, millimeter wave generation, ferroelectric thin film devices, organic semiconductors and electro-optic effects in molecular and liquid crystals. In 1964 he discovered several new electro-optic effects in liquid crystals, which led to the first working liquid crystal displays based on what he called the dynamic scattering mode (DSM).

Heilmeier spent much of the 1970s in the United States Department of Defense. From 1970-71 he served as a White House Fellow and special assistant to the Secretary of Defense, performing long-range research and development planning. In 1971 he was appointed Assistant Director for Defense Research and Engineering, Electronic and Physical Sciences, overseeing all research and exploratory development in electronics and the physical sciences. In 1975 he was named Director of the Defense Advanced Research Projects Agency (DARPA) and initiated major efforts in stealth aircraft, space-based lasers, space-based infrared technology, and artificial intelligence.

In December 1977 Heilmeier left government to become vice president at Texas Instruments; in 1983 he was promoted to Chief Technical Officer. From 1991-1996 he was president and CEO of Bellcore (now Telcordia), ultimately overseeing its sale to Science Applications International Corporation (SAIC). He served as the company's chairman and CEO from 1996-1997, and afterwards as its chairman emeritus.

Heilmeier had received numerous awards, held 15 patents, and was a member of the National Academy of Engineering, the Defense Science Board, and the National Security Agency Advisory Board. He served on the board of trustees of Fidelity Investments and of Teletech Holdings, and the Board of Overseers of the School of Engineering and Applied Science of the University of Pennsylvania. He died of a stroke in 2014.

Dr. Heilmeier, the son of a janitor, was the first member of his family to finish high school.   His daughter, Beth Jarvie, said “it was the Christian character of my dad” as well as his ability to put his head down and push forward with the work at hand that played major roles in his contributions.

Heilmeier's Catechism
A set of questions credited to Heilmeier that anyone proposing a research project or product development effort should be able to answer.
What are you trying to do? Articulate your objectives using absolutely no jargon.
How is it done today, and what are the limits of current practice?
What's new in your approach and why do you think it will be successful?
Who cares?  If you're successful, what difference will it make? 
What are the risks and the payoffs?
How much will it cost? 
How long will it take? 
What are the midterm and final "exams" to check for success?

Selected awards
1976 IEEE David Sarnoff Award, IEEE
1990 C&C Prize
1991 National Medal of Science, USA
1992 National Academy of Engineering Founders Award, USA
1993 IRI Medal from the Industrial Research Institute, USA
1993 Vladimir Karapetoff Eminent Members' Award, Eta Kappa Nu
1996 John Scott Award, City of Philadelphia
1997 IEEE Medal of Honor, IEEE
1999 John Fritz Medal, American Association of Engineering Societies
2005 Kyoto Prize in advanced technology, Inamori Foundation
2006 Edwin H. Land Medal
2012 Charles Stark Draper Prize, National Academy of Engineering

Selected publications
1966 "Possible Ferroelectric Effects in Liquid Crystals and Related Liquids" (Williams, R. and Heilmeier, G. H.), Journal of Chemical Physics, 44: 638.
1968 "Dynamic Scattering: A New Electrooptic Effect in Certain Classes of Nematic Liquid Crystals" (with Zanoni, L. A. and Barton, L. A.), Proceedings of the IEEE, 56: 1162.
1970 "Liquid Crystal Display Devices", Scientific American, 222: 100.
1976 "Liquid Crystal Displays: An Experiment in Interdisciplinary Research that Worked", IEEE Transactions on Electron Devices, ED-23: 780.

References

Further reading
Oral history interview with George H. Heilmeier, Charles Babbage Institute, University of Minnesota.  Heilmeier describes his introduction to the Department of Defense as a White House Fellow assigned to the Office of the Secretary of Defense working in the Office of the Director of Defense Research and Engineering. Most of the interview is devoted to his years as Director of the Defense Advanced Research Projects Agency (1975–1977).
IEEE biography
Inamori Foundation biography

1936 births
2014 deaths
DARPA directors
IEEE Medal of Honor recipients
Draper Prize winners
National Medal of Science laureates
Texas Instruments people
University of Pennsylvania School of Engineering and Applied Science alumni
Members of the United States National Academy of Engineering
People from Philadelphia
Princeton University School of Engineering and Applied Science alumni
American chief executives
Kyoto laureates in Advanced Technology